Parammoplanus is a genus of aphid wasps in the family Crabronidae. There are about 19 described species in Parammoplanus.

Species
These 19 species belong to the genus Parammoplanus:

 Parammoplanus apache (Pate, 1937)
 Parammoplanus brooksi N. Smith, 2010
 Parammoplanus cavifrons N. Smith, 2010
 Parammoplanus flavidus N. Smith, 2010
 Parammoplanus foveatus N. Smith, 2010
 Parammoplanus griswoldi N. Smith, 2010
 Parammoplanus heydoni N. Smith, 2010
 Parammoplanus hiatus N. Smith, 2010
 Parammoplanus irwini N. Smith, 2010
 Parammoplanus lenape (Pate, 1937)
 Parammoplanus montanus N. Smith, 2010
 Parammoplanus olamentke (Pate, 1943)
 Parammoplanus parkeri N. Smith, 2010
 Parammoplanus succinacius N. Smith, 2010
 Parammoplanus texanus N. Smith, 2010
 Parammoplanus verrucosus N. Smith, 2010
 Parammoplanus woolleyi N. Smith, 2010
 Parammoplanus yanegai N. Smith, 2010
 Parammoplanus zolnerowichi N. Smith, 2010

References

Crabronidae
Articles created by Qbugbot